Minnesota Avenue is an island-platformed Washington Metro station in the Central Northeast/Mahaning Heights  neighborhood of Northeast Washington, D.C., United States. The station was opened on November 20, 1978, and is operated by the Washington Metropolitan Area Transit Authority (WMATA). Providing service for the Orange Line, the station is the last station East Of The River, and the last above ground station for westbound trains until East Falls Church; west of the station, trains cross over the Anacostia River, then curve over RFK Stadium parking lots before descending underground.

Location
Minnesota Avenue station is located between Kenilworth Avenue and Minnesota Avenue, at Grant Street, immediately east of the CSX Landover Subdivision rail bed. The station is an east-Washington commuter station with a small parking lot and many Metrobuses serving the east side of the city from here. It is also southwest of the historic western terminus of the Chesapeake Beach Railway.

History
The station opened on November 20, 1978.

In May 2018, Metro announced an extensive renovation of platforms at twenty stations across the system. New Carrollton station was closed from May 28, 2022, through September 5, 2022, as part of the summer platform improvement project, which also affected the Minnesota Avenue, Deanwood, Cheverly, and Landover stations on the Orange Line. Shuttle buses and free parking were provided at the closed stations.

Station layout

References

External links
 

 Kenilworth Avenue entrance from Google Maps Street View
 Minnesota Avenue entrance from Google Maps Street View

Stations on the Orange Line (Washington Metro)
Washington Metro stations in Washington, D.C.
Railway stations in the United States opened in 1978
1978 establishments in Washington, D.C.
Northeast (Washington, D.C.)